Shafrira Goldwasser (born 1959) is an Israeli-American computer scientist and winner of the Turing Award in 2012. She is the RSA Professor of Electrical Engineering and Computer Science at Massachusetts Institute of Technology; a professor of mathematical sciences at the Weizmann Institute of Science, Israel; the director of the Simons Institute for the Theory of Computing at the University of California, Berkeley; and co-founder and chief scientist of Duality Technologies.

Education and early life
Born in New York City, Goldwasser obtained her Bachelor of Science degree in 1979 in mathematics and science from Carnegie Mellon. She continued her studies in computer science at Berkeley, receiving a Master of Science degree in 1981 and a PhD in 1984.  While at Berkeley, she and her doctoral advisor, Manuel Blum, would propose the Blum-Goldwasser cryptosystem.

Career and research
Goldwasser joined MIT in 1983, and in 1997 became the first holder of the RSA Professorship.  She became a professor at the Weizmann Institute of Science, concurrent to her professorship at MIT, in 1993. She is a member of the theory of computation group at MIT Computer Science and Artificial Intelligence Laboratory. In 2005, Goldwasser was elected a member of the National Academy of Engineering for contributions to cryptography, number theory, and complexity theory, and their applications to privacy and security, and in 2006, Berkeley awarded her its Computer Science Distinguished Alumni Award. 

Goldwasser was a co-recipient of the 2012 Turing Award for "revolutionizing the science of cryptography". 

Since November 2016, Goldwasser has been serving as the chief scientist and co-Founder of Duality Technologies, a US-based start-up which offers secure data analytics using advanced cryptographic techniques. She is also a scientific advisor for several technology startups in the security area, including QED-it, specializing in the Zero Knowledge Blockchain, and Algorand, a pure proof-of-stake blockchain.

On January 1, 2018, she became the director of Berkeley's Simons Institute for the Theory of Computing.

Goldwasser's research areas include computational complexity theory, cryptography and computational number theory. 
She is the co-inventor of probabilistic encryption, which set up and achieved the gold standard for security for data encryption. 

Goldwasser is a co-inventor of zero-knowledge proofs, which probabilistically and interactively demonstrate the validity of an assertion without conveying any additional knowledge, and are a key tool in the design of cryptographic protocols. Her work in complexity theory includes the classification of approximation problems, showing that some problems in NP remain hard even when only an approximate solution is needed, and pioneering methods for delegating computations to untrusted servers. Her work in number theory includes the invention with Joe Kilian of primality proving using elliptic curves. Goldwasser is also a lead on Project CETI, an interdisciplinary initiative for translating the communication of sperm whales.

Awards and honors
Goldwasser was awarded the 2012 Turing Award along with Silvio Micali for their work in the field of cryptography.

Goldwasser has twice won the Gödel Prize in theoretical computer science: first in 1993 (for "The knowledge complexity of interactive proof systems"), and again in 2001 (for Interactive Proofs and the Hardness of Approximating Cliques). Other awards include the ACM Grace Murray Hopper Award (1996) for outstanding young computer professional of the year and the RSA Award for Excellence in Mathematics (1998) for outstanding mathematical contributions to cryptography. In 2001 she was elected to the American Academy of Arts and Sciences and in 2002 she gave a plenary lecture at the International Congress of Mathematicians in Beijing. In 2004 she was elected to the National Academy of Sciences, and in 2005 to the National Academy of Engineering. She was selected as an IACR Fellow in 2007.  Goldwasser received the 2008–2009 Athena Lecturer Award of the Association for Computing Machinery's Committee on Women in Computing. She is the recipient of The Franklin Institute's 2010 Benjamin Franklin Medal in Computer and Cognitive Science. She received the IEEE Emanuel R. Piore Award in 2011.
She received the 2018 Frontier of Knowledge award together with Micali, Rivest and Shamir.

Goldwasser was elected as an ACM Fellow in 2017. In July 2017, she was a plenary lecturer in the Mathematical Congress of the Americas.

In 2018, Goldwasser was awarded an honorary degree by her alma mater, Carnegie Mellon University. On 26 June 2019 Goldwasser was awarded an honorary doctorate of science by the University of Oxford.

Goldwasser is featured in the Notable Women in Computing cards. She won the Suffrage Science award in 2016. She was on the Mathematical Sciences jury for the Infosys Prize in 2020. She was awarded the 2021 L’Oréal-UNESCO for Women in Science Award in Computer Science.

References

American computer scientists
Israeli computer scientists
Theoretical computer scientists
1959 births
Living people
Modern cryptographers
Israeli women computer scientists
American women mathematicians
Israeli women academics
Fellows of the Association for Computing Machinery
International Association for Cryptologic Research fellows
Members of the United States National Academy of Engineering
Members of the United States National Academy of Sciences
Foreign Members of the Russian Academy of Sciences
Gödel Prize laureates
Grace Murray Hopper Award laureates
Turing Award laureates
Academic staff of Weizmann Institute of Science
Carnegie Mellon University alumni
UC Berkeley College of Engineering alumni
American emigrants to Israel
Naturalized citizens of Israel
Israeli Jews
Jewish American scientists
MIT School of Engineering faculty
Scientists from New York City
20th-century American engineers
21st-century American engineers
20th-century American mathematicians
21st-century American mathematicians
20th-century American women scientists
21st-century American women scientists
Simons Investigator
20th-century women mathematicians
21st-century women mathematicians
Mathematicians from New York (state)
Israeli cryptographers